Phon Sai is a district (amphoe) in the southeastern part of Roi Et province, northeastern Thailand.

Geography
Neighboring districts are (from the west clockwise): Suwannaphum and Nong Hi of Roi Et Province; Sila Lat and Rasi Salai of Sisaket province; and Rattanaburi of Surin province.

History
The minor district (king amphoe) Phon Sai was established on 16 November 1976, when the two tambons, Phon Sai and Samkha, were split off from Suwannaphum district. It was upgraded to a full district on 25 May 1989.

Administration
The district is divided into five sub-districts (tambons), which are further subdivided into 58 villages (mubans). Phon Sai is a township (thesaban tambon) which covers parts of tambon Phon Sai. There are a further four tambon administrative organizations (TAO).

References

External links
amphoe.com

Phon Sai